STV Studios (previously STV Productions, SMG Productions, and originally known as Scottish Television Enterprises) is the television production arm of the STV Group plc. Headquartered in Glasgow, Scotland, and with an office in London, England, the company's output includes drama, factual, and entertainment programming for broadcast on television stations worldwide. A key programming supplier to the television industry in the United Kingdom, STV Studios' output is aired on all UK terrestrial networks as well as major satellite and cable stations.

Company details

Founded in 1957 by Canadian newspaper magnate Roy Thomson, Scottish Television Enterprises was the main content provider for the group's flagship ITV franchise STV.

In the 1960s, its productions were often criticized for perceived low quality, with its parent company almost losing the ITV franchise as a result.

By the 1970s, fortunes had improved and Scottish Television Enterprises had hopes of becoming a major content provider for the mooted ITV2 station that was being considered by the ITA, however, this never came to fruition and the resulting economic environment caused the company to experience very lean years.

The opening of the new Channel 4 provided an opportunity for Scottish Television to produce nationally networked programs, and they became a major provider of the religious content that Channel 4 was mandated to show. The main ITV network also began showing Take the High Road nationally, and in 1983, STV would produce one of its most well-known programs, Taggart.

In February 2019, STV Productions and Primal Media announced a two-year deal.

References

External links
 

1957 establishments in Scotland
Companies based in Glasgow
British companies established in 1957
Mass media companies established in 1957
STV Group
Television in Scotland
Television production companies of the United Kingdom